Akathumuri is a scenic lakeside village and an education hub in Cheruniyoor panchayat of Varkala Taluk in Thiruvananthapuram district of Kerala, India.

Transport
It is connected by road and rail by Akathumuri railway station. The railway station is not an important one, in the Thiruvananthapuram - Kollam route; only passenger trains halt here.

References

External links
 About Akathumuri
 Tourism in Akathumuri

Villages in Thiruvananthapuram district